50 Year Anniversary World Tour is a Neil Diamond tour that marked the 50th Anniversary of Diamond's first hit single, "Solitary Man," released in 1966.  It began in Fresno, California on April 7, 2017, and concluded at The O2 Arena in London on October 19, 2017.  The tour began just after the March release of a 50-song, three-disc career-spanning box set titled Neil Diamond 50 – 50th Anniversary Collection.
The Oceania tour was announced on November 10, 2017  and cancelled on January 22, 2018, after Diamond announced he had been diagnosed with Parkinson's disease.

Set list 

 "In My Lifetime"
 "Cherry, Cherry"
 "You Got to Me"
 "Solitary Man"
 "Love on the Rocks"
 "Hello Again"
 "Play Me"
 "Song Sung Blue"
 "Beautiful Noise"
 "Desiree"
 "Dry Your Eyes"
 "If You Know What I Mean"
 "Forever in Blue Jeans"
 "You Don't Bring Me Flowers"
 "Red Red Wine"
 "I'm a Believer"
 "Girl, You'll Be a Woman Soon"
 "Brooklyn Road"
 "Stones"
 "Be"
 "Lonely Looking Sky"
 "Skybird"
 "Jazz Time"
 "Soolaimon"
 "Holly Holy"
 "I Am ...I Said"
 "Sweet Caroline"
 "Cracklin' Rosie"
 "Brother Love's Travelling Salvation Show"

Shows

Cancelled shows

Notes

References

2017 concert tours
Neil Diamond concert tours